Spanish Room is a local service district and designated place in the Canadian province of Newfoundland and Labrador.

This settlement is north of Marystown on the northern harbour. It is accessible from Route 210. Beyond Spanish Room is the settlement of Rock Harbour.

Geography 
Spanish Room is in Newfoundland within Subdivision D of Division No. 2.

Demographics 

Government 
Spanish Room is a local service district (LSD) that is governed by a committee responsible for the provision of certain services to the community. The chair of the LSD committee is Randy Hanrahan.

See also 
List of communities in Newfoundland and Labrador
List of designated places in Newfoundland and Labrador
List of local service districts in Newfoundland and Labrador

References 

Designated places in Newfoundland and Labrador
Local service districts in Newfoundland and Labrador